Sphingopyxis witflariensis is a Gram-negative and strictly aerobic bacterium from the genus of Sphingopyxis which has been isolated from activated sludge from Wetzlar in Germany.

References

Sphingomonadales
Bacteria described in 2002